The Sultan's School is a private school in Seeb, Oman.

The student roll is around 1300 from KG through to year 13. The curriculum is bilingual, with Arabic Language, Islamic Education and Social Studies taught in Arabic, and English Language, Mathematics and the Sciences taught in English. A full range of foundation subjects are taught in both languages.

Curriculum
The English curriculum in the elementary school is based on the English National Curriculum and the Arabic curriculum follows the Ministry of Education's "Basic Education Program". In the secondary school, the curriculum is aimed towards preparation for the International General Certificate of Secondary Education examinations. The International Baccalaureate Diploma (IBD) is also offered in Years 12 and 13. The IB Diploma Program (DP) is a course of study for students aged 16–19 years of age. Current options outside of the core include Information Technology, Business Studies, Economics, Drama, Art, and Design and Technology.

External links

Private schools in Oman
Educational institutions established in 1977
1977 establishments in Oman